Tim Quarterman (born October 27, 1994) is an American professional basketball player for KK Feniks 2010 of the Macedonian First League. He attended and played college basketball for Louisiana State University (LSU).

High school career
A  guard from Savannah, Georgia, Quarterman attended Sol C. Johnson High School. As a senior, he averaged 19.5 points, 6.2 rebounds, 5.1 assists and 3.4 steals per game, leading the Atom Smashers to the Class AAA state title.

College career
Quarterman came to LSU in 2013. He was a starter for the Tigers as a sophomore and junior and averaged 8.4 points (39.7% FG, 31.0% 3PT, 66.0% FT), 3.9 rebounds, 3.1 assists and 1.04 steals in 98 games (three seasons).

As a junior, Quarterman averaged 11.2 points, 4.6 rebounds, 3.6 assists and 0.97 steals in 33 games and following the season, he declared for the 2016 NBA draft.

Professional career

Portland Trail Blazers (2016–2017)
After going undrafted in the 2016 NBA draft, Quarterman joined the Charlotte Hornets for the 2016 NBA Summer League. On July 25, 2016, he signed with the Portland Trail Blazers. Quarterman made his NBA debut on November 9, 2016 in a 111–80 loss to the Los Angeles Clippers, recording four points and one rebound in six minutes off the bench. In the Trail Blazers' regular-season finale on April 12, 2017, Quarterman scored a career-high 10 points on 4-of-11 shooting in a 103–100 loss to the New Orleans Pelicans. During his rookie season, Quarterman had multiple assignments with the Windy City Bulls and Long Island Nets of the NBA Development League, pursuant to the flexible assignment rule.

Agua Caliente Clippers (2018)
On June 28, 2017, Quarterman was traded to the Houston Rockets in exchange for cash considerations. He was waived by the Rockets on October 13.

On January 2, 2018, Quarterman signed with the Jiangsu Dragons of the Chinese Basketball Association, but due to visa issues, he was replaced on the roster before appearing in a game.

In February 2018, Quarterman joined the Agua Caliente Clippers of the NBA G League, averaging 8.9 points in 11 games.

Houston Rockets (2018) 
Quarterman signed with the Houston Rockets on March 30, only to be waived on April 12 after seeing action in three games.

Ironi Nahariya (2018)
On November 22, 2018, Quarterman signed a one-month contract with Ironi Nahariya of the Israeli Premier League. He parted ways with Nahariya on January 1, 2019, after appearing in three games. He averaged 5.0 points, 4.0 rebounds and 3.7 assists in 24.0 minutes per game.

Super City Rangers (2019)
On April 8, 2019, Quarterman signed with the Super City Rangers for the 2019 New Zealand NBL season. He parted ways with the Rangers on June 29, 2019. In 15 games (all starts) for the Rangers, Quarterman posted averages of 28.1 points, 5.6 assists and 5.5 rebounds in over 36 minutes per game.

Sioux Falls Skyforce (2020)
On January 27, 2020, Quarterman was acquired by the Sioux Falls Skyforce of the NBA G League.

Caballeros de Culiacán (2022–present) 
On April 10, 2022, Quarterman signed with Caballeros de Culiacán.

Personal life
He is the son of Melissa Quarterman and majored in sports administration.

Legal issues 
On January 20, 2018, Quarterman was arrested in Tupelo, Mississippi, on charges of aggravated assault and felony fleeing.

On August 7, 2020, Quarterman was arrested in Savannah, Georgia, after a narcotics investigation resulted in officers finding guns and marijuana in a residence.

NBA career statistics

Regular season

|-
| align="left" | 
| align="left" | Portland
| 16 || 0 || 5.0 || .448 || .385 || .000 || .9 || .7 || .1 || .2 || 1.9
|-
| align="left" | 
| align="left" | Houston
| 3 || 0 || 4.3 || .333 || .000 || 1.000 || 1.0 || .3 || .0 || .0 || 1.3 
|-class="sortbottom"
| align="center" colspan=2| Career
| 19 || 0 || 4.9 || .438 || .333 || .400 || .9 || .6 || .1 || .2 || 1.8

Playoffs

|-
| align="left" | 2017
| align="left" | Portland
| 2 || 0 || 3.5 || .500 || .500 || .000|| .0 || .5 || .0 || .0 || 1.5
|-class="sortbottom"
| align="center" colspan=2| Career
| 2 || 0 || 3.5 || .500 || .500 || .000|| .0 || .5 || .0 || .0 || 1.5

References

External links

LSU Tigers bio
"NBL: Supercity Rangers import Tim Quarterman inspired by 'big brother' Damian Lillard" at stuff.co.nz

1994 births
Living people
African-American basketball players
Agua Caliente Clippers players
American expatriate basketball people in Israel
American expatriate basketball people in Mexico
American expatriate basketball people in New Zealand
American men's basketball players
Basketball players from Savannah, Georgia
Caballeros de Culiacán players
Houston Rockets players
Ironi Nahariya players
Long Island Nets players
LSU Tigers basketball players
Point guards
Portland Trail Blazers players
Shooting guards
Sioux Falls Skyforce players
Super City Rangers players
Undrafted National Basketball Association players
Windy City Bulls players
21st-century African-American sportspeople